Armando Rueda (19 February 1929 – 27 November 2018) was a Mexican weightlifter. He competed at the 1948 Summer Olympics and the 1952 Summer Olympics.

References

External links
 

1929 births
2018 deaths
Mexican male weightlifters
Olympic weightlifters of Mexico
Weightlifters at the 1948 Summer Olympics
Weightlifters at the 1952 Summer Olympics
Sportspeople from Torreón
20th-century Mexican people